The Price Produce and Service Station is a collection of three related commercial buildings at 413, 415, and 417 East Emma Avenue in Springdale, Arkansas.  It includes one building that hosted an automotive filling station and produce shop, a second that traditionally housed a barbershop, and a third structure, originally open but now enclosed and housing a residence, that was used as an automobile service area.  The buildings were all built in 1934, and are united by common Art Deco styling, most prominently lancet-topped pilasters that rise above the height of their roofs.  The complex is regarded as a fine local example of vernacular Art Deco, and as a surviving element of the automotive culture of the 1930s.

The buildings were listed on the National Register of Historic Places in 2011.

See also
National Register of Historic Places listings in Washington County, Arkansas

References

Gas stations on the National Register of Historic Places in Arkansas
Commercial buildings completed in 1934
Buildings and structures in Springdale, Arkansas
National Register of Historic Places in Washington County, Arkansas
1934 establishments in Arkansas
Art Deco architecture in Arkansas
Commercial buildings on the National Register of Historic Places in Arkansas